Myoxocephalus niger, the warthead sculpin, is a species of marine ray-finned fish belonging to the family Cottidae, the typical sculpins. This demersal fish is found in the northern Pacific Ocean, with a range extending from the Peter the Great Gulf and the Kamchatka Peninsula into the Bering Sea.

References

niger
Taxa named by Tarleton Hoffman Bean 
Fish of the Bering Sea
Sea of Okhotsk
Fauna of the Aleutian Islands
Fish described in 1881